Funemployed is a four-track EP by British punk rock band Gnarwolves released on 17 June 2013 through Big Scary Monsters. All four tracks would later appear on the compilation album Chronicles of Gnarnia.

Track listing

Personnel
Gnarwolves
Thom Weeks - Vocals/Guitar
Charlie Piper - Vocals/Bass
Max Weeks - Drums

References

2013 EPs
Big Scary Monsters Recording Company EPs
Gnarwolves albums